Acacia continua, or the thorn wattle, is a shrub belonging to the genus Acacia and the subgenus Alatae. It native to New South Wales and South Australia.

Description
It blooms between winter and spring producing large yellow spherical flowers in winter. The wrinkled brown seed pods are brittle to leathery.

Taxonomy
The species was first formally described by the botanist George Bentham in 1864 in the work Flora Australiensis. It was reclassified as Racosperma continuum by Leslie Pedley in 2003 then transferred back to the genus Acacia in 2006. The species is often confused and misidentified as Acacia colletioides.

The specific epithet is taken from the Latin word continua meaning uninterrupted, in reference to the phyllodes running continuously from the stems and branchlets.

Distribution
In New South Wales it is found in central and western parts on rocky ridges and along rivers and creeks as part of mallee and Callitris woodland communities.

In South Australia the species often occurs on the Eyre Peninsula as well as the Flinders Range and Mount Lofty Range extending south to the coast. It is found growing on hard sandy alkaline or calcareous soils as a part of open woodland, scrubland and Triodia grassland communities.

See also
 List of Acacia species

References

continua
Flora of South Australia
Flora of New South Wales
Plants described in 1864
Taxa named by George Bentham